Cicero Township is one of 29 townships in Cook County, Illinois, USA. It is coextensive with the town of Cicero. As of the 2010 census, its population was 83,891.

Geography

Major highways
  Illinois Route 50 - Cicero Avenue
  U.S. Route 34 - Ogden Avenue

Adjacent townships
 Berwyn Township (west)
 Oak Park Township (northwest)
 Stickney Township (south)

Demographics

Political districts
 State House District 21
 State House District 23
 State House District 24
 State Senate District 11
 State Senate District 12

References
 
 United States Census Bureau 2009 TIGER/Line Shapefiles
 United States National Atlas

External links

 City-Data.com
 Illinois State Archives
 Township Officials of Illinois
 Cook County Official Site

Townships in Cook County, Illinois
Townships in Illinois